Étienne Lécroart (born 1960) is a French cartoonist. He is a founder and key member of Oubapo association, Ouvroir de BAnde dessinée POtentielle. He has composed cartoons that could be read either horizontally, vertically, or in diagonal, and vice versa. He also plays the sousaphone, and participates in several musical bands.

Awards
 1999 : Lauréat du Trophée Presse-Citron, best French press editorial cartoon
 2003 : Grand Prix de l'Humour Noir Grandville 2003

Bibliography
L'Ère du cornichon (Car rien n'a d'importance - 1992)
Pervenche et Victor (L'Association - 1994)
Pat et Tic (Hors Gabarit - 1995)
La vie exemplaire de Saint Sinus (Cornélius - 1995)
Poil au Cupidon (Glénat - 1995)
Oupus 1 (L'Association - 1996)
La Vie de bureau (Hors Collection - 1996)
Et c'est comme ça que je me suis enrhumée (Le Seuil - 1998)
Ratatouille (Le Seuil - 1999)
Cercle vicieux (L'Association - 2000) — the first half of the cartoon is used for the second half, but in the reverse order.
Oupus 3 (L'Association - 2000)
Tout l'humour du monde (Glénat - 2001)
Machins trucs (Glénat - 2002)
Superlipopette (Glénat - 2003)
Le Cycle (L'Association - 2003)
Oupus 2 (L'Association - 2003)
Oupus 4 (L'Association - 2004)
Scroubabble (Jeu - L'Association - 2005)
L'élite à la portée de tous (L'Association - 2005)

Music 
Copains Comme Cochons

External links
 

French comics artists
French comics writers
Living people
1960 births
French male writers
Oulipo members